The Corrective Move, officially referred to as the "Glorious Corrective Move" and often referred to as the "Corrective Step", was the takeover of the Yemeni National Liberation Front by the Marxist faction led by Abdel Fattah Ismail and Salim Rubai, in an internal bloodless coup on 22 June 1969 that overthrew the moderate President Qahtan al-Shaabi. The leftist takeover later led to the creation of the Yemeni Socialist Party (YSP), and South Yemen's transformation into a socialist state.

References

South Yemen
Communist revolutions
1969 in Yemen